Walter Daniel Buland (February 7, 1892 – May 26, 1937) was a professional football player in the early National Football League. He played in the NFL for the Rock Island Independents, Green Bay Packers and Duluth Eskimos. He also played for the Minneapolis Marines prior to their entry into the NFL. Buland also played in one of the two very first NFL games. On October 3, 1920, during a game between the Independents and the Muncie Flyers, Buland blocked a Ken Huffine punt in the Flyers endzone and recovered it for a touchdown.

References

External links
    

1892 births
1937 deaths
Players of American football from Minnesota
Duluth Eskimos players
Green Bay Packers players
Minneapolis Marines players
Rock Island Independents players